This article is a list of diseases of sunflowers (Helianthus annuus) and jerusalem artichoke (H. tuberosus).

Bacterial  diseases

Fungal diseases

Nematodes, parasitic

Phytoplasma and Viral diseases

References 

 Common Names of Diseases, The American Phytopathological Society

Sunflower